The great fruit-eating bat (Artibeus lituratus) is a bat species found from Mexico to Brazil and Argentina, as well as in Antigua and Barbuda, Barbados, Grenada, Martinique, Saint Lucia, Saint Vincent and the Grenadines and Trinidad and Tobago.

Description 

The heart of A. lituratus contains unique membranous structures not seen in any other mammal. The functions of these differences are still being studied, but may possibly aid in keeping the heart in the correct position while upside down, flight assistance, and energy reservation.

Threats 
Reproductive damage within A. lituratus has been linked with the insecticide deltamethrin.

Gallery

References

Artibeus
Bats of Central America
Bats of South America
Bats of the Caribbean
Bats of Brazil
Bats of Mexico
Mammals of Colombia
Mammals of Peru
Mammals described in 1818
Taxa named by Ignaz von Olfers